(born in 1960) is a Japanese manga artist.

Born in Tokyo, Koike won the prestigious Tezuka Award in 1976, when he was 16.

His style, similar to Katsuhiro Otomo and Moebius, is marked by vivid representations of psychedelic experiences.

Drugs are an important part of his inspiration: "Except peyotl, I have tried almost everything: hashish, heroin, cocain, acid, magic mushrooms... From a strictly graphical point of view, however, LSD is most important by far..." He is best known as the author of manga Heaven's Door and Ultra Heaven.

His work was first presented to English audiences in 2016.

Works 
 1985: Shadow Man
 1985–1986: Spinoza
 1988: Katajikenai
 1988: G
 1989–1991: Astroid
 2002–hiatus: Ultra Heaven
 2003: Heaven's Door

References 

Manga artists from Tokyo
Japanese graphic novelists
1960 births
Living people